The Hypnotist (Spanish:El hipnotizador) is a 1940 Mexican comedy mystery film directed by Antonio Helú and starring Carmen Hermosillo and Carlos López Moctezuma.

Cast
 Joaquín Coss
 Esteban V. Escalante 
 Carmen Hermosillo 
 Rafael Icardo 
 Carlos López Moctezuma
 Miguel Montemayor 
 Manuel Noriega 
 Ramón Vallarino

References

Bibliography 
 Angel Villatoro. Anuario Cinematográfico Latino Americano: 1946-47, Volume 1.

External links 
 

1940 films
1940s comedy mystery films
Mexican comedy mystery films
1940s Spanish-language films
Films directed by Antonio Helú
Mexican black-and-white films
1940 comedy films
1940s Mexican films